Peter Taylor Persons (born September 8, 1962) is an American professional golfer who has played on the PGA Tour and the Nationwide Tour.

Persons was born and raised in Macon, Georgia. He received coaching and training in the junior program developed by Georgia Golf Hall of Fame member Dan Nyimicz at Idle Hour Golf Club in Macon. Persons won the 1980 Georgia Junior Championship and was the runner-up to Sam Randolph at the 1985 U.S. Amateur. He was the 1984–1985 Georgia Golf Association Men's Player of the Year. He attended the University of Georgia and was a member of the golf team. He turned professional in 1986.

Persons played in a limited number of PGA Tour events in the 1980s. He played full-time on the elite Tour from 1990–1993; and on the Nike Tour (now called the Nationwide Tour) from 1994–1996. His best year in professional golf was 1990; he had a win at the Chattanooga Classic, a T-6 at the Hawaiian Open, and finished 66th on the final money list that year. At the 1990 Chattanooga Classic, he finished at 20-under-par 260 to defeat Richard Zokol by two strokes. The tournament was held the same week as the NEC World Series of Golf where most of the Tour's top-tier players elected to compete.

Amateur wins
1980 Georgia Junior Championship
1984 Georgia Amateur
1985 SEC Championship (individual)

Professional wins (1)

PGA Tour wins (1)

Results in major championships

Note: Persons never played in The Open Championship.

CUT = missed the half-way cut
"T" = tied

See also 

 1989 PGA Tour Qualifying School graduates

References

External links

American male golfers
Georgia Bulldogs men's golfers
PGA Tour golfers
Golfers from Georgia (U.S. state)
Sportspeople from Macon, Georgia
1962 births
Living people